Az'zal District is a district of the Sana'a, Yemen. As of 2003, it had a population of 115,054.

References

Districts of Amanat Al Asimah Governorate